The  is an annual season ticket for the elderly and disabled (aged over 20). It allows free second-class transport in the Île-de-France on all services provided by the RATP (the regional public transport authority) and the SNCF (the state-owned national railway operator).

Eligibility 
The card is provided to:

 Those over 65 years of age, or 60 who are recognised as unfit for work
 Those over 20 years of age who are assessed as being more than 80% disabled
 War veterans and their widows over 65 years of age
 Those deported or,  interned or placed in concentration camps during the Second World War, and their French dependents over 60 years of age, subject to a means test
 Those that served in reserved occupations, and their widows, without being subject to a means test.

Format 
The Carte Améthyste is provided through the recipient's local Social Services department. It allows free travel in second class on services provided by the RATP and the SNCF in the  Île-de-France. It can also be used on the night bus service Noctilien, but not to get to or from the airports, nor buses that have special fares.

The card is valid for a year from the date of issue, and can be renewed annually. It can be combined with the Carte Rubis, which is designed for use on the Optile bus network.

Renewal was included in the price of the card.

References 

Transport in Île-de-France
Fare collection systems in France